Víska u Jevíčka is a municipality and village in Svitavy District in the Pardubice Region of the Czech Republic. It has about 200 inhabitants.

History
The first written mention of Víska u Jevíčka is from 1258.

References

Villages in Svitavy District